Gonichthys venetus is a species of ray-finned fish within the family Myctophidae. The species is found distributed in the southeastern Pacific Ocean off New Caledonia, French Polynesia to the Galápagos Islands, and central Chile. It lives at depths up to 1,310 meters, however most populations are found shallower than 1,000 meters. Adults reach up to 4 centimeters in lengths.

The species has been assessed as 'Least concern' by the IUCN Red List as it has a large distribution with no known major threats.

References 

Fish described in 1964
IUCN Red List least concern species
Myctophidae
Fish of the Pacific Ocean